Justice Carter may refer to:

Ben Carter (Arkansas judge) (c. 1895–1943), associate justice of the Arkansas Supreme Court
Edward F. Carter (1897–1981), associate justice of the Nebraska Supreme Court
Francis B. Carter (1861–1937), associate justice of the Florida Supreme Court
Gene Carter (1935–2021), associate justice of the Maine Supreme Judicial Court
James H. Carter (1935–2016), associate justice of the Iowa Supreme Court
Jesse F. Carter (1873–1943), associate justice of the South Carolina Supreme Court
Jesse W. Carter (1888–1959), associate justice of the Supreme Court of California
Joseph N. Carter (1843–1913), associate justice of the Illinois Supreme Court
Orrin N. Carter (1854–1928), associate justice of the Illinois Supreme Court

See also
David Kellogg Cartter (1812–1887), chief justice of the Supreme Court of the District of Columbia
Judge Carter (disambiguation)
Carter (surname)